John Hanley Cannady (September 5, 1923 – September 28, 2002) was an American football linebacker in the National Football League for the New York Giants. He played college football at Indiana University and was drafted in the third round of the 1947 NFL Draft. The first professional football player from Charleston, South Carolina, known as "Big John," he was the New York Giants' second-round draft pick in 1947 and played from 1947 to 1954. A teammate of Frank Gifford from 1952 to 1954, Big John was a member of the New York Giants’ 1950 team that finished with a 10-2 record and tied for first place in the American Conference. He played in the league’s Pro Bowl game in 1950 and 1952. He played in the first NFL Pro Bowl. Big John was a member of the National Football League Players Association, and Indiana University Members Association. He was named to the South Carolina Athletic Hall of Fame in 1991, and to the Post and Courier’s list of South Carolina’s 100 greatest athletes of the 20th century.

References

External links

1923 births
2002 deaths
American football linebackers
Indiana Hoosiers football players
New York Giants players
Eastern Conference Pro Bowl players